Felix Imadiyi (born 25 May 1958) is a Nigerian former sprinter. He competed in the men's 4 × 400 metres relay at the 1980 Summer Olympics.

References

1958 births
Living people
Athletes (track and field) at the 1980 Summer Olympics
Nigerian male sprinters
Olympic athletes of Nigeria
Place of birth missing (living people)
20th-century Nigerian people